Seeking the Way: The Greatest Hits is a Shadows Fall greatest hits collection, covering songs the band released through their previous label Century Media. The songs are taken from the following releases:
 Second LP Of One Blood (2000)
 Japanese EP Deadworld (2001)
 Third LP The Art of Balance (2002)
 Fourth LP The War Within (2004)
 Compilation Fallout from the War (2006)

The first three songs are taken from the band's 2000 release Of One Blood. They have been completely remixed and remastered. The next two tracks (4 and 5) are taken from the band's 2001 Japanese EP Deadworld (despite both songs appearing on later releases). These two tracks have also been remixed and remastered.

Track listing

Personnel
Brian Fair – vocals
Jonathan Donais – lead guitar, vocals
Matt Bachand – rhythm guitar, vocals
Paul Romanko – bass
David Germain – drums (tracks 1-3)
Derek Kerswill – drums (tracks 4-5)
Jason Bittner – drums (tracks 6-14)

References

2007 greatest hits albums
Shadows Fall albums
Century Media Records compilation albums
Melodic death metal compilation albums
Thrash metal compilation albums